High Point is the name of two places in the U.S. state of Florida:
High Point, Hernando County, Florida
High Point, Palm Beach County, Florida

See also
List of Florida's highest points